Super Singer is a 2006 Indian Tamil-language reality television singing competition, that is sponsored by Asian Paints for the ninth Season. The show is televised in India on Vijay TV, and worldwide through partner broadcasting networks. The show, together with its spin-off editions such as Super Singer Junior, are part of Vijay TV's Super Singer TV series.

The program, which debuted on 28 April 2006, seeks to discover the best playback recording voice and singing talent in Tamil Nadu through a series of statewide auditions. Selected contestants are required to participate in several competition rounds, often based on a theme for a given week, and aim to be selected to perform in the show's grand finale each season.

Winners and finalists of the competition have been offered chances to sing a song in upcoming Tamil movies, and other prizes such as sums of money, gold, and real estate property. Super Singer Season is currently telecasting on Vijay television for their nine season.

Overview

Season synopsis

Season 1

The first season premiered on 28 April 2006, with a series of episodes which telecast auditions for the show. Auditions were held across the state of Tamil Nadu in the cities of Coimbatore, Chennai, and Madurai. Performances by auditioning contestants were judged by singers S. P. Sailaja, Jency, Malaysia Vasudevan, Sirkazhi Sivachidambaram, Mahathi, and music director D. Imman.

The show was hosted by playback singer Chinmayi. Later stages of the competition were held at a specially designed studio set, and performances were judged by a panel of permanent judges consisting of playback singers Anuradha Sriram, Srinivas, and P. Unnikrishnan. Contestants were eliminated during the competition, and finalists received special training from voice expert Ananth Vaidyanathan in the final stages of the competition.

Season 1 title winner Nikhil Mathew was formally introduced as a playback singer after he sang the song "Enadhuyire" in the Tamil film Bheema for music director, Harris Jayaraj. Season 1 runner up and viewer's choice, Anitha V. (now known as Anitha Karthikeyan) was formally introduced as a playback singer in the Tamil film Marudhamalai by music director D. Imman.

Season 2

The second season was premiered on 7 July 2008; It held a series of episodes that telecast auditions for the show. Auditions for the show, which commenced on 27 June 2008, were held across three cities in the state of Tamil Nadu. Performances by auditioning contestants were judged by playback singers S. P. Sailaja and Srilekha Parthasarathy in the city of Coimbatore, Sunitha Sarathy and Deepan Chakravarthy in the city of Chennai, as well as Mahathi and Mathangi in the city of Trichy.

Playback singer Chinmayi returned as a permanent host of the show up to and including 21 January 2009, following which she left the show much to the disappointment of many fans of the show. She was replaced by a duo, singer-actor Yugendran and his wife Malini for the remainder of the show in 2009. Playback singers P. Unnikrishnan and Srinivas returned as permanent judges of the show, and a new permanent judge, playback singer Sujatha replaced Anuradha Sriram (who instead appeared as a guest judge through the season). Contestants were eliminated during the competition, and finalists received special training from voice expert Ananth Vaidyanathan in the final stages of the competition.

Ajeesh won the competition and was chosen by Yuvan Shankar Raja to sing the song Idhu Varai for the soundtrack of Tamil film, Goa.

Season 3

The auditions were held in various parts of Tamil Nadu, and were judged by singers including S. P. Sailaja, Nithyasree Mahadevan, Unni Menon, Sowmya, Harish Raghavendra, Pop Shalini, Mahathi, and Malgudi Shubha. Sujatha, P. Unnikrishnan and Srinivas continued to be the permanent judges for the second consecutive season.

Saicharan won the competition, and was chosen by A. R. Rahman and D. Imman to sing in the films Godfather, Manam Kothi Paravai, and Saattai.

Season 4

The auditions were held in various parts of Tamil Nadu, and were judged by singers including S. P. Sailaja, Nithyasree Mahadevan, Unni Menon, Sowmya, Devan Ekambaram, Pop Shalini, Mahathi, Malgudi Shubha and Rajinderpal Singh. Sujatha, P. Unnikrishnan and Srinivas continued to be the permanent judges for the third consecutive season.

Diwakar won the competition, and was chosen by music directors D. Imman, Vivek-Mervin, and Kannan to sing in the films Panjumittai, Vadacurry, and Kalkandu.

Season 5

The fifth season was hosted by Priyanka Deshpande, Ma Ka Pa Anand, and Bhavna Balakrishnan.

The auditions were held in various parts of Tamil Nadu and were telecast until 3 July. First-round audition judges included season 3 winner Saisharan, season 4 winner Diwakar, and former contestants from those seasons such as D. Sathyaprakash, Pooja Vaidyanath, Santhosh Hariharan, and Sonia. Second and third round audition judges included S. P. Charan, Pushpavanam Kuppusamy, Devan Ekambaram, James Vasanthan, Mahathi, S. Sowmya, and Pop Shalini. Zonal audition judges were permanent judges from the junior version of the show, Malgudi Shubha, Mano, and K. S. Chithra. A total of 33 contestants were selected for the finals, including local, international, and former contestants.

At the finale of the show, contestant Anand Aravindakshan was declared the winner of the season, while contestant Fareedha was declared first runner-up. Both finalists were promised an opportunity to sing for one of the upcoming films of music director Santhosh Narayanan. Contestant Rajaganapathy was chosen as the judge's choice scoring the highest marks and being declared the second runner-up of the season.

The season landed in controversy as social media users accused the STAR Vijay Indian TV channel of wrongdoing. Social media users expressed concern that audiences who spent time and money to support talented youngsters were the victim of unethical practices and criticised the channel for not being upfront about the fact that the winning contestant was already a professional playback singer - which was defended by the channel.

Season 6

The sixth season of Super Singer 6 was hosted by Ma Ka Pa Anand and Priyanka Deshpande, which ran from 21 January 2018 to 15 July 2018 and was broadcast by Star Vijay.

All the episodes of Super singer 6 are available on the OTT platform Hotstar.

The Judges Panel include Anuradha Sriram, P. Unnikrishnan, Swetha Mohan, and Benny Dayal. A.R.Rahman was the Ambassador for this season. The top 6 Finalist were Rakshitha, Sreekanth, Shakthi, Anirudh, Malavika and Senthil Ganesh. The results of the finale are given as:

 Senthil Ganesh was declared the Winner of the Super Singer Season 6
 Rakshitha Suresh became the first runner up of the season and gets applauded by everyone for being the "Golden Voice of the Season".
 Malavika Rajesh Vaidya was the second runner up of the season.
 Suswaram Anirudh , Sakthi Amaran , Sreekanth Hariharan were the other finalists

Season 7

The Seventh Season of Super Singer 7 started on 27 April 2019 and finished on 10 November on Star Vijay and was telecast from 8 PM onwards. Ma Ka Pa Anand and Priyanka Deshpande return as the hosts for this season.

This season returns with the same judges' panel including, Anuradha SriRam, Unni Krishnan, Shweta Mohan, and Benny Dayal. Anirudh Ravichandran is the Ambassador for this season. The top 5 were Mookuthi Murugan (SS3), Sam Vishal (SS7), Vikram (SS13), Gowtham, and Punya(SS 6).

Winners:

 Murugan was declared the Winner of the Super Singer Season 7 and received a 50 lakh worth house by Arun Excello.
 Vikram was the first runner up of the season and was awarded 25 lakh gold by Gold one.
 Sam Vishal and Punya were tied as the second runner up of the season.
 Gowtham was the third runner up of the season.

All of the episodes of this season are available on the OTT Platform-Hotstar.

Season 8
The Eighth Season of Super Singer AKA Super Singer Season 8 premiered on 24 January 2021 with a Grand launch of a six-hour program on Star Vijay with grace performances of Hariharan, Shankar Mahadevan, Anuradha Sriram, P. Unnikrishnan, Sid Sriram, Sakthisree Gopalan, Saindhavi, Vijay Prakash, Karthik, Anthony Daasan Shashaa Tirupati, Benny Dayal, Kalpana Raghavendar, Pradeep, Vijay Yesudas, S. P. Charan, Gana Bala, Chinnaponnu, Karunas.
All the episodes will be available on the OTT Platform-Hotstar.

The judging panel was often shuffled with Anuradha Sriram, P. Unnikrishnan, Benny Dayal, Shweta Mohan, S.P. Charan, Shakthishree Gopalan, and Kalpana Raghavendar. 

The Grand Finale Super Singer Season 8 aired on September 26th 2021. Sridhar Sena won the title of Super Singer 8.

Prize Winners:

 Sridhar Sena was announced the Winner of the Super Singer Season 8 and received a 10 lakh award by Vijay TV. He has also been provided the opportunity to sing in a future film song composed by Anirudh Ravichander.
 Bharat K Rajesh  (announced by Mervin Solomon) was the runner up of the season and was awarded an amount of 3 lakhs and an additional amount of Rs 50,000.
 Abhilash Venkatachalam was announced third place by Santhosh Narayanan. He received a cash prize of Rs 2 lakh, and stated that the money was going to be spent for those who were affected by the COVID - 19 Pandemic situation.
 Muthusirpi was awarded the title of Differentiator of the Season and received an amount of Rs 1 lakh, presented by KS Chitra.

Season 8 contestants

Season 9

The Nine Season of Super Singer 9 started on 19 November 2022 on Star Vijay and was telecast from every Saturday and Sunday at 18:30 IST. Ma Ka Pa Anand and Priyanka Deshpande returns as the hosts for this season. This season returns with the same judges' panel including, Anuradha SriRam, Unni Krishnan, Shweta Mohan, and Benny Dayal.

November 19-20th 2022: Auditions Episode

November 26-27th 2022: Top 20 Selection

December 3-4th 2022:

Spin-off

Super Singer T20

Super Singer T20 (சூப்பர் சிங்கர் T20) is a 2012-2015 Indian Tamil-language reality television singing competition, which aired on Star Vijay. Former contestants from previous seasons of the Super Singer and Airtel Super Singer Junior shows were divided into 6 teams. 15 league matches were held where each team competed against the other five teams. 4 teams were selected for the knockout semi-finals, before the remaining 2 teams competed against each other in the finals. The show was hosted by Divyadarshini.

Super Singer - Champion of Champions
Super Singer - Champion of Champions is a 2020 Indian Tamil-language reality television singing competition, which aired on Star Vijay. The show has nearly 24 singers, all of them winners and finalists of Super Singers, who are now performing batch by batch, and with no audience to cheer them on. The show was aired from 15 August to 1 November 2020 and ended with 21 Episodes.

Shankar Mahadevan, Sudha Ragunathan, K. S. Chithra, Chinmayi, Anuradha Sriram, Benny Dayal, Kalpana Raghavendar, Vijay Yesudas, Shweta Mohan and Sikkil Gurucharan as the judges, take turns to watch their performance live, albeit, from their homes. The show was hosted by Ma Ka Pa Anand and Priyanka Deshpande. Super Singer Champion Of Champions Winner is Hari Priya.

contestants

 Dhivakar
 Saecharan
 Santosh
 MALAVIKA
 Haripriya
 Senthil Ganesh
 Rajalakshmi
 Energy
 Praveen
 Naveen Samson
 Srinivasan
 Manoj Kumar
 Samvishhal
 Srinisha
 Sudhankumar
 Wow
 Shivangi
 Ajay
 Sharath
 Rangapriya
 Aparna
 Vikram
 Vijay

Adaptations

See also
 Super Singer Junior
 Super Singer T20
 Vijay tv

References

External links
 Official Super Singer Junior Forum

Airtel Super Singer
Star Vijay original programming
2006 Tamil-language television series debuts
Tamil-language singing talent shows
Tamil-language reality television series
Tamil-language television shows
Television shows set in Tamil Nadu
2021 Tamil-language television seasons